The Khalden training camp (also transliterated Khaldan) was one of the 
oldest and best-known military training camps in Afghanistan. It was located in the mountains of eastern Paktia Province, near to Tora Bora.

While some reporters repeat descriptions offered by US intelligence officials that the camp was an al-Qaeda training camp, other reporters note that the camp was set up during the Soviet occupation of Afghanistan, with the support of the Central Intelligence Agency. Having attended one of these camps has triggered suspicion for many of the detainees in the War on Terror. The Khalden training camp was led by Ibn al-Shaykh al-Libi, who was captured in late 2001.

Ahmed Ressam, the Millennium Bomber, said he attended the camp using the alias "Nabil", beginning in April 1998 for five to six months.  He said Khalden Camp then generally hosted 50–100 trainees at any time, and he trained there in light weapons, handguns, small machine guns, rocket-propelled grenade launchers (RPGs), explosives (including TNT, C4 plastic explosives, and black plastic explosives), poisons (including cyanide), poison gas, sabotage, target selection, urban warfare, tactics (including assassinations), and security.  Trainees were from Jordan, Algeria, Yemen, Saudi Arabia, Chechnya, Turkey, Sweden, Germany, and France.  During the time he was there, he met Zacarias Moussaoui.

During the early years of the War in Afghanistan, the Bush administration described the Khalden Camp as an al-Qaeda training facility, an assertion used as evidence of an alleged connection to al-Qaeda for Abu Zubaydah and more than 50 other men held as enemy combatants at the Guantanamo Bay detention camp. Since 2006, however, this allegation has been contested by the 9/11 Commission Report, Brynjar Lia, head of the international terrorism and global jihadism at the Norwegian Defence Research Establishment; and unclassified records from the detainees' tribunal reviews (CSRT)s at Guantanamo.

Zubaydah testified in his Combatant Status Review Tribunal (CSRT) that the Khalden Camp was at such odds with al-Qaeda and bin Laden that it was closed by the Taliban in 2000, at bin Laden's request. This account was corroborated by two other detainees, Noor Uthman Muhammed, alleged by the U.S. Government to have been the emir, or leader, of the Khalden Camp; and Khalid Sulayman Jaydh Al Hubayshi, a close friend of Zubaydah. In addition, Muhamed's charge sheet refers to the closing of the Khalden camp at the request of terrorist leaders.

Brynjar Lia wrote in his 2008 book that an ideological conflict, between the leaders of the Khalden Camp and the Taliban and al-Qaeda, led to the closing of the Khalden Camp. Zubaydah, Khalid Sulayman Jaydh Al Hubayshi, and Noor Uthman Muhammed confirmed this divide in their CSRT testimony. Of the 57 detainees the U.S. Government claims are associated with the Khalden Camp, 27 have been released, including Zubaydah's friend Al Hubayshi.

Doğu Türkistan Bülteni Haber Ajansı which is the Turkish media arm of the Uyghur Turkistan Islamic Party wrote a biography they wrote on one of their members, Garib (Asadullah) Turkistani in 1997 who went to Pakistan, was tutored by Abdullah Azzam in religious learning in camp Khalden in order to join the Taliban because he wanted Shariah. He moved to Kabul to enlist in the Mujahideen. He came part of Liwa al Ansar and was injured in a car accident while fleeing the American invasion of Afghanistan in 2001. He died while fighting against American troops who they called "Crusaders".

The Uyghur Turkistan Islamic Party's "Islamic Turkistan" magazine in its 5th edition published an obituary of its member Turghun (Ibn Umar al Turkistani) speaking of his time training at the Al Khaldan training camp and his meeting with Ibn al-Shaykh al-Libi. The Uyghurs in Afghanistan fought against the American bombing and the Northern Alliance after the September 11, 2001 attacks. Ibn Umar died fighting against Americans at Qala-i-Jangi that month.

Individuals alleged to have attended the Khalden training camp

References

Al-Qaeda facilities
Terrorist training camps